Fernando Daniel Rodrigues Almeida (born 11 May 1996), known professionally as Fernando Daniel is a Portuguese singer-songwriter. He won the fourth edition of The Voice Portugal in 2016.

Career

2014: Factor X 
He first appeared in the musical industry in 2014, on the Portuguese TV show Factor X, which is the Portuguese version of the worldwide known music show The X Factor. He auditioned on the second edition, alone, and was finally eliminated in the piano phase. However, the judges liked his voice and decided join him together with Luana Ribeiro, another contestant who was eliminated at the piano phase. Together, they formed the group BABEL, which finally ended 4th place overall at the show.

2016: The Voice Portugal 
Later, in 2016, he appeared on the 4th season of The Voice Portugal to try his luck again. His audition was a huge success worldwide and in the country, beating the record of the most watched audition of The Voice. He went on to win the show in December, receiving the majority of the public votes.

2017: Festival da Canção and first original single 
In 2017, he was invited by the Portuguese composer Henrique Feist to sing his song "Poema a Dois" in Festival da Canção and try to represent Portugal in the Eurovision Song Contest 2017. He finished in 5th place on the Final. The Grand Finale was eventually won by Salvador Sobral, who sang "Amar Pelos Dois", that ended up winning the contest.

In July 2017, Fernando Daniel released his first original single, "Espera", which was included in the soundtrack for the Portuguese telenovela "A Herdeira". "Espera" was included in his first studio album, Salto, which was released in March 2018.

2019: MTV EMA winner 
In 2019, Fernando won the Best Portuguese Act award at the 2019 MTV Europe Music Awards receiving the prize at the live event in Seville.

2021–present: The Voice Kids coach and Junior Eurovision Song Contest composer 
Since 2021, he has been one of the four coaches of the children's version of The Voice Portugal. His first season was the second season in this format, becoming the first The Voice Portugal winner to become a coach. His contestant, Simão Oliveira, won the contest and represented Portugal in the Junior Eurovision Song Contest 2021 in Paris. Fernando was later on selected by RTP1 as the composer of the song. Later that year, it was announced that Fernando would return in 2022 as a coach. In his second season, his contestant, Maria Gil, won the series, making him the winning coach for two consecutive seasons.

Discography

Studio albums

Singles

Awards

References 

1996 births
Living people
21st-century Portuguese male singers
The Voice (franchise) winners
Portuguese pop singers
The X Factor contestants
MTV Europe Music Award winners